René Sutter (born 5 January 1966) is a Swiss former footballer who played as a midfielder.

Club career
Sutter started playing football at the age of eight at FC Bümpliz, which later became SC Bümpliz 78. In the 1984−85 season, he started playing for their first team in the 2. Liga, which at the time was the fourth highest division in the Swiss football league system. In 1985, he signed for first division club BSC Young Boys, where he stayed for five years. With the club, he won the Swiss Championship at the end the 1985−86 season, and lifted the Swiss Cup in 1987. In 1990, he moved to league rival FC Aarau, where he was part of the side that won the Swiss national title in 1992–93 under manager Rolf Fringer. In 1993, he returned to the Young Boys. In the later years of his career, Sutter played for Yverdon Sport FC, FC Baden and FC Wil 1900, before returnning to his youth club SC Bümpliz in 2001. After one season at FC Solothurn, he retired from professional football in 2003.

International career
In 1989, Sutter earned his only two caps for the Swiss national team. His first game was on 7 June 1989 against Czechoslovakia, where he appeared as a starter, before being substituted by Kubilay Türkyilmaz in the 58th minute. His team lost the game 0–1. Two weeks later, he made his second and final appearance for Switzerland, when we was brought on as a substitute in the 56th minute in a friendly game against Brazil. The game ended in a surprising 1–0 victory for Switzerland.

Personal life
After his retirement from professional football, Sutter studied law, today he works as a legal professional for an institution of the Swiss government.

He is the brother of fromer Swiss national footballer Alain Sutter and the father of Swiss footballer Nicola Sutter.

Honours
BSC Young Boys
 Swiss Championship: 1985–86
 Swiss Cup: 1986–87

FC Aarau
 Swiss Championship: 1992–93

References

External links
 
 

1966 births
Living people
Swiss men's footballers
BSC Young Boys players
FC Aarau players
Yverdon-Sport FC players
FC Baden players
FC Wil players
SC Bümpliz 78 players
FC Solothurn players
Association football midfielders
Swiss Super League players
Switzerland international footballers